Club Deportivo Ribadumia is a Spanish football team based in Ribadumia, Province of Pontevedra, in the autonomous community of Galicia. Founded in 1959 it currently plays in Preferente de Galicia – Group 2 (A), holding home games at Campo de Fútbol de A Senra, which has a capacity of 4,000 spectators.

Season to season

6 seasons in Tercera División

Honours
Preferente Autonómica: 2013–14

External links
Futbolme team profile 
Arefe Regional team profile 

Football clubs in Galicia (Spain)
Association football clubs established in 1959
1959 establishments in Spain